Marty Martinez may refer to:

Marty Martínez, former MLB player, manager and coach
Marty Martinez (soccer), manager for the West Virginia Chaos soccer team
Matthew G. Martinez, former US Congressional Representative
Martin Casaus, American professional wrestler under the ring name of Marty "The Moth" Martinez.